Lower Woodside is a hamlet in the Central Bedfordshire district of Bedfordshire, England.

The settlement lies north of Aley Green and south-west of Woodside. Lower Woodside forms part of the wider Slip End civil parish, and is close to the county border with Hertfordshire. The nearest large town to the settlement is Luton.

External links 
 Lower Woodside Farm – Bedfordshire Archives

Hamlets in Bedfordshire
Central Bedfordshire District